Đorđe Tomić (born 11 November 1972) is a Serbian former footballer who played as a midfielder.

Club career
Tomić made his senior debut for Partizan in the second part of the 1992–93 season, as the club won the championship. He would help the side win the double in the following 1993–94 season, receiving much more playing time.

International career
In February 1999, Tomić made his solo appearance for FR Yugoslavia under manager Milan Živadinović. He came on as a second-half substitute for Jovan Stanković during a Euro 2000 qualifier against Malta, which ended in a 3–0 victory.

Post-playing career
After hanging up his boots, Tomić served as president of Srem Jakovo.

Honours
Partizan
 First League of FR Yugoslavia: 1992–93, 1993–94, 1998–99
 FR Yugoslavia Cup: 1993–94

References

External links
 
 
 
 
 

1972 births
Living people
Footballers from Belgrade
Serbia and Montenegro footballers
Serbian footballers
Association football midfielders
Serbia and Montenegro international footballers
FK Partizan players
OFK Beograd players
FK Hajduk Kula players
En Avant Guingamp players
Atlético Madrid B players
Atlético Madrid footballers
Real Oviedo players
Incheon United FC players
First League of Serbia and Montenegro players
Ligue 1 players
Segunda División players
La Liga players
K League 1 players
Serbia and Montenegro expatriate footballers
Expatriate footballers in France
Expatriate footballers in Spain
Expatriate footballers in South Korea
Serbia and Montenegro expatriate sportspeople in France
Serbia and Montenegro expatriate sportspeople in Spain
Serbia and Montenegro expatriate sportspeople in South Korea